The Medal "For the Defence of Kyiv" was a World War II campaign medal of the Soviet Union established on June 21, 1961 by decree of the Presidium of the Supreme Soviet of the USSR to be awarded to the participants of the defence of the city of Kyiv during the 1941 invasion of the USSR by Nazi Germany.

Medal Statute 
The Medal "For the Defence of Kyiv" was awarded to all participants in the defence of the Hero-City of Kyiv - Soviet Army soldiers and troops of the former NKVD, as well as all the workers who participated in the defence of Kyiv in the ranks of the militia, in the construction of fortifications, who worked in factories serving the needs of the front, members of the Kyiv underground and partisans who fought against the enemy near Kyiv. 

Award of the medal was made on behalf of the Presidium of the Supreme Soviet of the USSR on the basis of documents attesting to actual participation in the defence of Kyiv.  Serving military personnel received the medal from their unit commander, retirees from military service received the medal from a regional, municipal or district military commissioner in the recipient's community, members of the civilian population, participants in the defence of Kyiv received their medal from the Kyiv Oblast and city Soviets.  For the defenders who died in battle or prior to the establishment of the medal, it was awarded posthumously to the family.  

The Medal "For the Defence of Kyiv" was worn on the left side of the chest and in the presence of other awards of the USSR, was located immediately after the Medal "For the Defence of Stalingrad".  If worn in the presence of Orders or medals of the Russian Federation, the latter have precedence.

Medal Description 
The Medal "For the Defence of Kyiv" was a 32mm in diameter circular brass medal with a raised rim.  On its obverse, the relief image of the building of the Supreme Soviet of the Ukrainian SSR with a flag waving from its rooftop mast. Against the background of the building, the relief images of a red soldier, a red sailor, a worker and a woman, all guerrillas facing left with rifles at the ready.  Along the upper circumference of the medal, the relief inscription "FOR THE DEFENSE OF KYIV" bisected by the waving flag.  At the bottom, a relief five pointed star over a ribbon itself superimposed over laurel branches.  On the reverse near the top, the relief image of the hammer and sickle, below the image, the relief inscription in three rows "FOR OUR SOVIET MOTHERLAND".  

The Medal "For the Defence of Kyiv" was secured by a ring through the medal suspension loop to a standard Soviet pentagonal mount covered by a 24 mm wide olive green silk moiré ribbon with two central stripes, a 2 mm blue stripe and a 4 mm red stripe.

Recipients (partial list) 
The individuals below were all recipients of the Medal "For the Defence of Kyiv".

Artillery specialist Colonel Ivan Fedorovich Ladyga
Marshal of the Soviet Union Konstantin Rokossovsky
Army General Ivan Ivanovich Fedyuninsky
Colonel General Aleksandr Ilich Rodimtsev
Marshal of the Soviet Union Ivan Khristoforovich Bagramyan

See also 
Awards and decorations of the Soviet Union
Battle of Kyiv (1943)
Hero City

References

External links 
 Legal Library of the USSR

Soviet campaign medals
Military awards and decorations of the Soviet Union
Awards established in 1961
1961 establishments in the Soviet Union